The 1906 Tipperary Senior Hurling Championship was the 17th staging of the Tipperary Senior Hurling Championship since its establishment by the Tipperary County Board in 1887.

Two-Mile Borris were the defending champions.

Thurles won the championship after a 4-11 to 3-06 defeat of Lahorna de Wets in the final. It was their third championship title overall and their first title since 1904.

References

Tipperary
Tipperary Senior Hurling Championship